Air Bucharest serves the following destinations as of November 2012:

Destinations 

As of February 2021, Air Bucharest operates leisure charter flights to destinations across Europe and the Middle East:
Greece
Corfu – Corfu International Airport
Heraklion – Heraklion International Airport
Rhodes – Rhodes International Airport, "Diagoras"
Israel
Tel Aviv - Ben Gurion International Airport
Romania
Bacău – Bacău International Airport
Bucharest – Henri Coandă International Airport – Base
Cluj-Napoca – Cluj-Napoca International Airport
Iași – Iași International Airport
Timișoara – Traian Vuia International Airport
Turkey
Antalya – Antalya Airport
Bodrum – Milas–Bodrum Airport

References

Lists of airline destinations